{{DISPLAYTITLE:C18H37NO2}}
The molecular formula C18H37NO2 may refer to molecules with the same number of atoms but different structure:

 Palmitoylethanolamide
 Sphingosine